The Revolutionary Council of the People's Democratic Party of Afghanistan (PDPA) ruled the Democratic Republic of Afghanistan from 1978 until its collapse in 1992. The council was the supreme state power under the communist regime and was a carbon copy of the Supreme Soviet in the Soviet Union. The point with the council was to convene on a semiannual basis to approve decisions made by the presidium.

Rise to power 
After the Saur Revolution the biggest problem facing the party was the inner conflict between the two biggest groups in the party, the Khalqs and the Parchams. After taking power, Nur Mohammad Taraki refused to reveal information about the PDPA's organization and how it was built up. Taraki never revealed the identities of the members of the Revolutionary Council during his reign.

When the PDPA seized power with help from the Afghan army, it was the army soldiers to announce their victory over Mohammed Daoud Khan and the first decree ever released by the government was released by the Revolutionary Council of the Armed Forces under the control of Afghan air force Colonel Abdul Qadir. The Revolutionary Council of the Armed Forces eventually merged itself with the Revolutionary Council of the Democratic Republic of Afghanistan. Later on the members of the Revolutionary Council met and elected Taraki as the Chairman of the Council and Prime Minister of Afghanistan. Taraki eventually revealed that there were in total 35 members in the council, which five of them were military officers and all of them were members of the PDPA. Taraki never published a list of the members of the Revolutionary Council and because of that most their names remains unknown.

On the Revolutionary Council's second meeting on 1 May 1978 they elected the new Ministers of Afghanistan. The meeting showed indicated that the distribution of power was in the Khalqs hands with 11 Khalqis being elected and 7 Parchamis. Babrak Karmal was elected to the position of Vice Chairman of the council, the second highest position. He was also elected Deputy Prime Minister in which he shared with Hafizullah Amin and Mohammad Aslam Watanjar. While a minority, the Parcham were able to get some important ministries such as the Ministry of the Interior, under the control of Nur Ahmed Nur. The Khalqis had full control of the Afghan security forces, Major Daoud Taroon was elected Chief of Police and Assadullah Sarwari was elected as the new boss of the Afghan secret police, AGSA.

On 24 May 1978 the Politburo announced the enlargement of the Revolutionary Council. This new enlarged council met for the first time on 12 June 1978 and this meeting is marked with two controversial changes. The first being to change the flag and replace it with a fully red one. The other being the declaration of the royal family to be traitors and removing their Afghan citizenships. Five days later the Revolutionary Council had a new meeting about the Parcham in the government, while not much information was or has been released about this meeting most of the Parcham politicians of the party were sent abroad as ambassadors.

Under the regime of Karmal, the Parchamis took the most important government positions, while also Independent politician rose to power. The Khalqi faction still outnumbered the Parchamis, especially in Afghan military and other security sectors. Because of the Khalq-Parcham power struggle discipline within the party broke down. Karmal tried to replace seven Khalqi military officers with Parchamis to get better control of the party, the officers ended sending the letters back. The government did nothing to intervene or stop these officers, while the government of Karmal eventually executed thirteen Amin supporters. This would indirectly lead to the Khalqi failed military coups in June, July and October which all happened in 1980. This eventually led to the purge of the Khalqis from the government which virtually shut down the government leaving the country at the hands of the Soviet advisers. During this phase the Parchamis with the help of the Soviets were able to crush the coup at the last second. While Karmal was unsuccessful when it came to destroy factionalism within the party, the party became more secure because of the Khalqi purge of the government. In June 1981 the Revolutionary Council with the Central Committee was again expanded, with now including fifteen more members. At this meeting Nur was appointed President of the Council and Sultan Ali Keshtmand became the new Prime Minister of Afghanistan.

New constitution 
In November 1986, Karmal resigned his post as President of the Council and left the new post open to former KHAD leader Mohammad Najibullah. Before Najibullah rose to power Sultan Ali Keshtmand was acting president of Afghanistan and the council. Under Najibullah's sought a ceasefire between Mujahideen and government forces, he called this process National Reconciliation. After the National Reconciliation talks the Loya jirga ratified the new constitution made by Najibullah and various resistance groups. The new constitution abolished the one-party system in the country and saw the establishment of the Meli Shura (Loya jirga), Sena (Senate) and the Wolasi Jirga (House of Representatives) which would eventually replace the Revolutionary Council. They also agreed to remove "democratic" from the official name of Afghanistan, so since 1987-1992 the official name was the Republic of Afghanistan.

Organization 
The Presidium of the Revolutionary Council consisted of all Revolutionary Council office bearer and some others. The Presidium's main role in PDPA and DRA politics was to serve as a legislature of such, approving state decisions before the Revolutionary Council could ratify them. The Presidium office also watched over the Council of Ministers. None to few Presidium members were members of the Council of Ministers, suggesting a deliberate  attempt of separating power between the two governmental bodies. Not much is known about the Presidium during Taraki and Amin's rule from 1978 to 1979. Right after the Soviet invasion it consisted of seven members, in which four of them were Parchams and three of them Khalqs.

The Presidium was the permanent ruling body of the Revolutionary Council. Members of the Presidium were elected by the Revolutionary Council. The President of the Revolutionary Council was the Chairman of the Presidium. The responsibilities of the Presidium were to enforce laws, granting amnesty or punishment among others.

Presidium in 1984

References 

People's Democratic Party of Afghanistan